Bahman 22 Dormitory ( – Kūy Sāzmānī 22 Bahman) is a Town in Saidabad Rural District, in the Central District of Shahriar County, Tehran Province, Iran. At the 2006 census, its population was 2,938, in 778 families.

References 

Populated places in Shahriar County